The UK Comic Art Award was a British awards for achievement in comic books. Winners were selected by an open vote among British comic book professionals (creators, editors, and retailers); the awards were given out on an annual basis from 1990 to 1997 for comics published in the United Kingdom the previous year. Award presentations were generally held at the Glasgow Comic Art Convention, usually in the spring.

The UK Comic Art Award took the place of the Eagle Award, a fan-voted award which had petered out by the end of the 1980s. The National Comics Awards took over for the UK Comic Art Award in 1997 (the National Comic Awards were themselves replaced by the rejuvenated Eagle Awards in the 2000s).

History
The Awards were founded in 1990 by Rusty Staples (Frank Plowright, Hassan Yussuf, and Richard Barker), the company responsible for organizing the United Kingdom Comic Art Convention (UKCAC). The awards were generally sponsored by Penguin Books UK.

The 1991 awards presentation was held at the Glasgow Comic Art Convention (GlasCAC) in late March. The 1993 awards presentation was again held in March at GlasCAC, Glasgow City Halls. The fifth annual UK Comic Art Awards were presented at GlasCAC on Sunday, March 20, 1994. The 1997 awards were presented at the UKCAC, at the UCL Institute of Education, London, on Sunday, March 16.

Awards
 Winners listed by year; for some categories, other nominees are listed after the winner.

Best Writer
 1990: Grant Morrison
 1991: Peter Milligan
 1992: John Wagner
 1993: Peter David
 Jamie Delano
 Peter Milligan
 1994: Peter Milligan (Shade, the Changing Man, Enigma, The Extremist)
 1997: Garth Ennis (Hitman, Preacher, Saint of Killers)
 Grant Morrison
 Alan Moore

Best Artist 
 1990: Simon Bisley
 1991: John Higgins
 1992: Simon Bisley
 1993: Colin MacNeil
 John M. Burns
 Simon Bisley
 Sean Phillips
 1994: Duncan Fegredo (Enigma, Shade covers)
 1997: Steve Dillon (Preacher)
 Adam Hughes
 Mike Mignola

Best Ink Artist 
 1997: Mark Farmer (The Incredible Hulk, Legion of Super-Heroes)
 Bill Sienkiewicz
 Mark Buckingham

Best Cover Artist 
 1997: Glenn Fabry (Preacher)
 Alex Ross
 Jason Brashill

Best Writer/Artist 
 1990: Peter Bagge
 1991: Kyle Baker
 Moebius
 1992: Frank Miller
 Peter Bagge
 Ted McKeever
 1993: Frank Miller
 Peter Bagge
 Alan Davis
 1994: Frank Miller (Sin City, writer on Man Without Fear)
 1997: Mike Mignola (Hellboy)
 David Lapham
 Daniel Clowes

Best Newcomer 
 1991: Mark Millar (writer, Saviour and Insiders)
 1993: Joe Quesada
 Chris Halls
 Travis Charest
 1994: Frank Quitely (Shimura, The Missionary Man)
 1997: Jim Murray (Judge Dredd)
 Pop Mahn
 Andy Pritchett

Best Auxiliary Contributor 
 1990: Paul Gravett
 1991: Dave Elliott (editor, A1)
 1993: Steve Oliff (colorist)
 Tim Quinn (editor, Marvel UK)
 Dave Elliott (publisher, Atomeka Press)
 1994: Ellie DeVille (letterer)
 1997: Matt Hollingsworth (colorist, Preacher)
 Joe Chiodo
 Ellie DeVille

Best Publisher 
 1990: DC Comics
 1991: DC Comics
 1993: DC Comics
 Fleetway Publications
 Dark Horse Comics
 1994: DC Comics

Best Character 
 1990: Tank Girl (Deadline)
 1991: Buddy Bradley (Hate)

Best Original Graphic Novel/One-Shot 
 1990: Arkham Asylum (Grant Morrison and Dave McKean)
 1991: Elektra Lives Again (Frank Miller and Lynn Varley)
 1992: Judgment on Gotham (John Wagner, Alan Grant, and Simon Bisley)
 1993: Night Cries (Archie Goodwin and Scott Hampton)
 Tell Me Dark (Karl Edward Wagner, John Ney Rieger, and Kent Williams)
 Skin (Peter Milligan, Brendan McCarthy, and Carol Swain)
 1994: Vendetta in Gotham (John Wagner, Alan Grant, and Cam Kennedy)
 1996: Stuck Rubber Baby (Howard Cruse)
 1997: The End of the Century Club (Ed Hillyer)
 Preacher Special (Garth Ennis and Steve Dillon)
 Suckle (Dave Cooper)

Best Graphic Novel Collection/Best Collection 
 1990: Ed the Happy Clown (Chester Brown)
 1991: The Complete Alec (Eddie Campbell)
 1992: Judge Dredd in America (John Wagner and Colin MacNeil)
 Maus II (Art Spiegelman)
 Eddy Current (Ted McKeever)
 1993: Sin City (Frank Miller)
 Killing Time (John Smith and Chris Weston)
 The Sandman: Season of Mists (Neil Gaiman, et al.)
 1994: Hugo Tate, O America (Nick Abadzis)
 1997: Preacher: Gone to Texas (Garth Ennis and Steve Dillon)
 Stray Bullets: Innocence of Nihilism (David Lapham)
 The Invisibles: Say You Want a Revolution (Grant Morrison and Steve Yeowell)

Best Translated Graphic Novel 
 1990: Lea: The Confessions of Julius Antoine (Serge Le Tendre and Christian Rossi)
 1991: Blueberry (Jean-Michel Charlier and Jean “Moebius” Giraud)
 1992: Heart Throbs (Max Cabanes)

Best Ongoing Publication 
 1990: Viz
 1991: Viz
 1992: Judge Dredd Megazine
 2000 AD
 Hate
 Viz
 1993: Judge Dredd Megazine
 Eightball
 2000 AD
 1994: Judge Dredd Megazine
 1997: Preacher
 2000 AD
 Acme Novelty Library

Best New Publication 
 1990: Bogey Man
 1991: Revolver
 1992: Blast!
 1993: Archer & Armstrong
 Red Dwarf (Fleetway)
 The Heckler
 Overkill
 1994: Man Without Fear (Marvel)
 1995: The Tale of One Bad Rat 
 1997: Kingdom Come
 Girl
 Superman Adventures

Biggest Influence on Comics 
 1990: Batman

Career Achievement Award 
 1990: Jack Kirby
 1991: Steve Ditko
 1992: John Wagner
 1993: John M. Burns
 Will Eisner
 Brian Bolland
 1994: Will Eisner
 1997: Joe Kubert
 Robert Crumb
 Alex Toth

See also
Ally Sloper Award
Eagle Award
National Comics Awards

References 

Comics awards
British awards
Awards established in 1990
Awards disestablished in 1997